Lambiella is a genus of lichen-forming fungi in the family Xylographaceae. The genus was circumscribed by German botanist Hannes Hertel in 1984, with Lambiella psephota assigned as the type species.

The genus name of Lambiella is in honour of Elke Mackenzie (1911–1990), born as Ivan Mackenzie Lamb, who was a British polar explorer and botanist who specialised in the field of lichenology.

Species

Lambiella aliphatica  – Alaska, US
Lambiella andreaeicola  – Falkland Islands
Lambiella arenosa  – Oregon, US
Lambiella caeca 
Lambiella furvella 
Lambiella fuscosora 
Lambiella globulosa  – Europe
Lambiella gyrizans 
Lambiella hepaticicola  – Australia
Lambiella impavida 
Lambiella insularis 
Lambiella isidiata  – Venezuela
Lambiella mullensis 
Lambiella psephota 
Lambiella sphacelata 
Lambiella subpsephota  – Falkland Islands

References

Baeomycetales
Baeomycetales genera
Taxa described in 1984
Lichen genera
Taxa named by Hannes Hertel